Odette Monard (5 August 1903 – 14 January 1989) was a French swimmer. She competed in the women's 200 metre breaststroke event at the 1924 Summer Olympics.

References

External links
 

1903 births
1989 deaths
French female breaststroke swimmers
Olympic swimmers of France
Swimmers at the 1924 Summer Olympics
Place of birth missing
20th-century French women